Havyaka Brahmins are the Hindu Indo AryanBrahmins from uttarakhand and uttarpradesh  India and living from many years in  Karnataka. Havyakas profess the Advaita philosophy propounded by Adi Shankaracharya. Most Havyakas can trace their immediate ancestry to either Sirsi, Uttara Kannada, Shivamogga, Udupi, Dakshina Kannada or Kodagu districts of Karnataka and Kasaragod district of Kerala.

Etymology 
The word Havyaka according to a linguistically correct derivation by Shri Sediyapu Krishna Bhat comes from Ahichchatra Bhrahmana: the community coming from Ahichchtra to Talagunda/Banavasi brought by Kadamba king Mayura Verma. According to Sediyapu, the word "Havyaka" is a Sanskritization of Ahika-Havika. This is supported by inscriptions. Sanskrit scholar Mahamahopadhyaya Nadahalli Ranganatha Sharma rejects Havya+Kavya derivation as grammatically incorrect. The word Havyaka was not used in official records until 1928 including in mutts and there is no basis for it in inscriptions. The name "Haiga", "Havika", "Haveeka" persists in Havyaka lexicon.
The word Havyaka might also be derived from the place named Haigunda. That region of Karnataka which has been inhabited by Havyakas from ancient times is also called Parashuramakshethra, Gorastradesha, Gokarnamandala. Anaghaa is a summit.

Origin of Havyakas 
Exact facts about Havyaka's origin are came by  research since there is very little research available. However, the scientific school of thought places the date of Havyaka's immigration back to about 1300 years ago i.e.around 9'th A.D. The Kadamba king Mayooravarma-2'nd of 9'th A.D. was instrumental in bringing the first Brahmin families. It is believed that the second Kadamba dynasty brought many Brahmins in to perform the royal rituals and the related functions of the empirical government from a place called Ahikshetra. From uttarakhand and uttarpradesh. Thus the first few families were settled in Banavasi (Sirsi),the capital of the Kadambas and the place adored by Pampa. King Mayooravarma -2'nd act of inviting Brahmins to Banavasi has been inscribed on a stone stab (Shilashasana), which now lies near the village of Varadahalli in Sagara.  The havyaka Brahmin families brought from ahikshetra of uttarakhand and uttarpradesh  those of present-day havyaka families. The havyaka Brahmins always follows god mantra in Sanskrit .

Present day 
Havyakas today are guided by Advaita philosophy of Shankaracharya. Havyakas derive their last names from the jobs that they perform rather than by their origin. They usually have their names end with either Bhat, Shastri, Hegde, Upadhyaya, Madhyastha,Joshi, pandit. Till recently Havyakas were primarily engaged in Vedic professions or they were in agriculture especially growing betel nut, paddy, banana, coconut, etc. A few decades ago they also started entering into all other vocations like business, education, employment, etc.

Rituals 
Men undergo the Upanayana when they turn seven years old to initiate them into Vedic studies. It is also known as Brahmopadesham. The key ritual during the Upanayana is that of putting a sacred thread called yajnopavitha or janivaara consisting of three cotton strands across the left shoulder of the boy. The initiate is called a dvija "twice-born" and is expected to perform the sandhyavandanam at least twice daily. Yajnopavitha has a special knot in it which is called as "Brahma Gantu". Havyaka Brahmins also undergo the Upakarma, where the sacred thread is changed.  In old vedas it is mentioned that after upanayana he enters the stage of Brahmacharya ashram, leading a celibate and austere life of a student in his teacher's home, eating from handouts given by the generous neighbours. It is equivalent to say he will undergo studies excluding all other aspects in modern days. When he has accomplished his studies of the Vedas, he enters the Grahastha ashram, a married man becoming head of his household. During the wedding the groom wears two janivaaras at the same time to signify his marriage.

Geographic Distribution 
Havyakas are mainly concentrated in the state of Karnataka. Dakshina Kannada, Sirsi, Uttara Kannada, Shivamogga, Chikkamangaluru, and Kodagu Districts in Karnataka and Kasaragod in Kerala are the districts where Havyakas live for centuries. They are now spread all over India, especially in metropolitan cities of Mumbai, New Delhi, Bengaluru, and other Industrial and business centers. Havyakas are also in large numbers in countries like the United States of America, the United Kingdom, U.A.E., Australia and other places outside India.

Language 
The Havyakas are united by their unique language. There are two distinct dialects of Havyaka language. One in Uttara Kannada and Shivamogga districts, and another in Dakshina Kannada and Kasaragodu districts.

Havyaka language has its origins in Halegannada language (Ancient Kannada) and hence is very similar to Kannada, and officially, it's considered a dialect of Kannada, Although, the speakers of modern Kannada find it difficult to understand Havyaka language.

The Havyaka dialect is supposed to be quite old. Its origins, like many other things in India, are shrouded in mystery. Notably certain Havigannada (Havyaka Kannada) speakers use gender-neutral pronouns in place of typical feminine pronouns while addressing females.

Havyaka Food 
Havyaka people are strict vegetarians and have unique speciality dishes.

Havyaka are known to cook food from all the available seasonal vegetables without wasting any part of it. For example, every part of a jackfruit is used to cook items, from dosas to halvas.

The unique variety of dosa include
Banana Dosa (bale Hannina dose, bale kayi dose), jackfruit dosa (halasina hannina dose, halasina kayi dose), coconut dosa, cucumber dosa (sauthe kayi dose), and varieties of rice cakes like:
"halasina kottige", "southe kottige","Halugumbala kayi kadubu","pathrode" and many more.

There are some unique recipes, like "Tellavu", "Todedevu", "Odape", "Kocheegayi gojju", "Mavinakai gojju", "Kai sasame", "Karakali","Majjige Polja","Holige", "Appehuli", "Tambuli","Halasinakayi melaara", "Halasina happala", "Kayi rasa", "Atirasa", "Kesari", "Hashi", and "Sandige","Shavige Rasayan".

Havyaka Gotra 
The Havyakas Brahmins follow the gotra system.
Vishwamitra  [Vaiśvāmitra, Devarāta, Autala]
Bharadwaja  1.[Aṅgirasa, Bārhaspatya, Bharadwāja] 2.[Kauṇḍinya, Maitravāruṇa, Vasiṣṭha]
Vashistha  [Vasiṣṭha, Śaktya, Paraśara]
Angeerasa
Gautama  [Āṅgirasa, Āyāsya, Gautama]
Jamadagni  [Bhārgava, Chyavana, Apnavāna/Apnuvat, Aurava, Jāmadagnya]
Kashyapa
Mauna Bhargava  [Bhārgava, Vītahavya, Sāvedasa]

See also 

Shivalli Brahmins
Gowda Saraswat Brahmins

References 

https://archive.org/details/Tulunadu
Tuluva Brahmins
https://archive.org/details/218431AncientKarnatakaHistoryOfTuluvaVolI
https://archive.org/details/AHistoryOfSouthKanara
https://archive.org/details/VaishnavismInVijayanagaraBASaletore_201603

External links 
 Official Havyaka Mahasabha site
 Official Havyaka Association of Americas site
 Latest on the Origin of the name

Indian surnames
Kannada Brahmins
Mangalorean society
Brahmin communities of Karnataka